Greg Stroman Jr. (born March 8, 1996) is an American football cornerback for the Chicago Bears of the National Football League (NFL). He played college football at Virginia Tech and was drafted by the Washington Redskins in the seventh round of the 2018 NFL Draft.

College career

Stroman attended Stonewall Jackson High School in Manassas, Virginia. At Stonewall Jackson, he was a first-team 6A All-State selection. A 3-star recruit, Stroman committed to play football for Virginia Tech over offers from Campbell, Duke, Norfolk State, Old Dominion, UMass, Virginia, and Wisconsin.

As a freshman, Stroman made an immediate impact for the Hokies on special teams as he fielded 36 punts for 249 yards. In his sophomore season, he recorded 27 punt returns for 109 yards and collecting 24 tackles on defense. In his junior season, Stroman tied for second in the ACC in both pass breakups (11, including one for a touchdown) and interceptions (four for 47 yards). He added 20 total tackles and 36 punts returned for 397 yards and two touchdowns on special teams. Stroman ranks second all-time in Virginia Tech history with six career return scores, trailing just DeAngelo Hall (seven). In the 2015 Independence Bowl against Tulsa, he had a career-long punt return of 67 yards.

Professional career

Washington Redskins / Football Team
Stroman was drafted by the Washington Redskins in the seventh round, 241st overall, of the 2018 NFL Draft. In his rookie season, Stroman played in 15 games, recording 38 tackles, 4 passes defended, 1 interception and 1 forced fumble.

On September 10, 2019, Stroman was waived/injured by the Redskins and reverted to the team's injured reserve list the next day. For the 2020 season he played in a few games before being placed on injured reserve again on October 16, 2020. Stroman was released on August 17, 2021.

Buffalo Bills
On December 2, 2021, Stroman was signed to the Buffalo Bills practice squad. He was released on December 9, 2021.

Los Angeles Rams
On December 16, 2021, Stroman was signed to the Los Angeles Rams practice squad. He was released on December 28.

Chicago Bears
On April 21, 2022, Stroman signed a one-year contract with the Chicago Bears. He was released on August 30, 2022. He was re-signed to the practice squad on December 28, 2022. He signed a reserve/future contract on January 26, 2023.

References

External links
Virginia Tech Hokies bio

1996 births
Living people
American football cornerbacks
American football return specialists
People from Prince William County, Virginia
Players of American football from Virginia
Sportspeople from the Washington metropolitan area
Virginia Tech Hokies football players
Washington Redskins players
Washington Football Team players
Buffalo Bills players
Los Angeles Rams players
Chicago Bears players